Genua (minor planet designation: 485 Genua) is a minor planet orbiting the Sun.

References

External links
 
 

Background asteroids
Genua
Genua
S-type asteroids (SMASS)
19020507